Juan Ignacio Luca de Tena y García de Torres, 2nd Marquis of Luca de Tena (Madrid, 23 October 1897 – 11 January 1975) was a Spanish politician, diplomat, journalist and playwright.

Career
Luca de Tena was Member of the Cortes (1958–64) and Ambassador of Spain to Chile (1940–44) and to Greece (1961–62).

Personal life
His son was the journalist Guillermo Luca de Tena. His daughter, María Victoria Luca de Tena, was married to Nemesio Fernández-Cuesta, a businessman and journalist.

Awards and decorations
 Cross of Military Merit
 Campaign medal for the Civil War
 Order of Merit of the German Eagle
 Grand Cross of the Order of Merit (Chile)
 Grand Cross of the Order of Juan Pablo Duarte (Dominican Republic)
 Order of the Medahuia (Morocco)

References

External links
Juan Ignacio Luca de Tena y García de Torres, Marquess of Luca de Tena in spanish

20th-century Spanish journalists
1897 births
1975 deaths
ABC (newspaper) editors
Politicians from Madrid
Spanish male dramatists and playwrights
Members of the Royal Spanish Academy
Crosses of Naval Merit
20th-century Spanish dramatists and playwrights
Ambassadors of Spain to Chile
Ambassadors of Spain to Greece
20th-century male writers